Taurocottus is a monospecific genus of marine ray-finned fish belonging to the family Cottidae, the typical sculpins. Its only species is Taurocottus bergii which is found in the northwestern Pacific Ocean.

References

Cottinae
Monotypic fish genera
Fish described in 1915